The Leigh UTC is a University Technical College (UTC) for the Dartford area of Kent, England, that opened in September 2014. The UTC specialises in Engineering and Computer Sciences.

Building work started in October 2013 at the Bridge development, where Joyce Green Hospital once stood. The main building opened to students in September 2014.

The Leigh UTC has an approach to learning that is project based.

As with all UTCs, a number of businesses and organisations support the College. These include:
 University of Greenwich
 Bluewater
 Kenard Engineering
 Eurostar

The Leigh UTC has opened a five-form entry Key Stage 3 feeder college, the Inspiration Academy, on the UTC site, in effect converting the education model into one of an 11–18 free school.

The Leigh UTC is part of Leigh Academies Trust.

References

External links 
 
 The Leigh Academies Trust

Dartford
Secondary schools in Kent
Educational institutions established in 2014
University Technical Colleges
University of Greenwich
Leigh Academies Trust
2014 establishments in England